Crosstown Traffic is a 1995 American TV movie. It was directed by George Hickenlooper who called it "a dreadful experience. It showed me that TV really is just a factory. But I needed the credit to get my Directors Guild card. I sold my soul to Satan; now I'm trying to get it back."

References

External links
Crosstown Traffic at IMDb

1995 television films
1995 films
Films directed by George Hickenlooper